Monique Andrade Ferreira (born 29 June 1980 in Rio de Janeiro) is a freestyle swimmer from Brazil. A member of Santos.

International career

She represented her native country at the 2004 Summer Olympics in Athens, Greece, and 2008 Summer Olympics in Beijing, China, with an Olympic final in Athens in the 4×200-metre freestyle (finishing in 7th place) in the curriculum. At this final, broke the South American record with a time of 8:05.29, along with Joanna Maranhão, Mariana Brochado and Paula Baracho. She also came in 19th place in 400-metre freestyle in Athens 2004. At Beijing 2008, finished 13th in the 4×100-metre freestyle, 21st in the 400-metre freestyle, and 28th in the 200-metre freestyle.

At the 1999 Pan American Games in Winnipeg, she won the bronze medal in the 4×200-metre freestyle. She also finished 6th in the 200-metre butterfly, and 9th in the 100-metre butterfly.

Monique was in 2000 FINA World Swimming Championships (25 m), in Athens, where she finished 25th in the 200-metre freestyle  and 9th in the 4×200-metre freestyle.

At the 2002 FINA World Swimming Championships (25 m), in Moscow, finished 21st in the 200-metre freestyle, 10th in the 400-metre freestyle  and 9th in the 4×200-metre freestyle 

She swam at the 2002 Pan Pacific Swimming Championships, where she finished 5th in the 4×200-metre freestyle, 6th in the 4×100-metre freestyle, 7th in the 400-metre freestyle, and 12th in the 200-metre freestyle.

Participating in the 2003 World Aquatics Championships in Barcelona, she got the 21st place in the 200-metre freestyle, 27th in the 400-metre freestyle, and 12th place in the 4×200-metre freestyle.

At the 2003 Pan American Games, in Santo Domingo, won the silver medal in the 4×200-metre freestyle, breaking the South American record, with a time of 8:10.54, along with Ana Muniz, Mariana Brochado, Paula Baracho She also won two bronze medals in the 400-metre freestyle, and in the 4×100-metre freestyle.

At the 2005 World Aquatics Championships, she finished 26th in the 200-metre freestyle, 25th in the 400-metre freestyle  and 13th in the 4×200-metre freestyle.

She was in the 2006 FINA World Swimming Championships (25 m), where she placed 31st in the 200-metre freestyle, was disqualified in the 400-metre freestyle  and got 9th place in the 4×200-metre freestyle.

At the 2007 Pan American Games, the Rio de Janeiro, Monique won the bronze medal in the 200-metre freestyle  and in the 4×200-metre freestyle. Monique also would have won the silver medal in the 4×100-metre freestyle, but this medal was revoked by Rebeca Gusmão's doping.

She was South American record holder in the 4×100-metre freestyle, with a time of 3:42.85, on August 9, 2008, along with Tatiana Lemos, Flávia Delaroli and Michelle Lenhardt.

After professional swimming

She ended her career in December 2011. Later, she went to work at COB.

References
 UOL Profile

1980 births
Living people
Brazilian female freestyle swimmers
Olympic swimmers of Brazil
Swimmers at the 1999 Pan American Games
Swimmers at the 2003 Pan American Games
Swimmers at the 2004 Summer Olympics
Swimmers at the 2007 Pan American Games
Swimmers at the 2008 Summer Olympics
Pan American Games silver medalists for Brazil
Pan American Games bronze medalists for Brazil
Pan American Games medalists in swimming
South American Games gold medalists for Brazil
South American Games silver medalists for Brazil
South American Games bronze medalists for Brazil
South American Games medalists in swimming
Competitors at the 2006 South American Games
Medalists at the 1999 Pan American Games
Medalists at the 2003 Pan American Games
Medalists at the 2007 Pan American Games
Swimmers from Rio de Janeiro (city)
20th-century Brazilian women
21st-century Brazilian women